Qu’est-ce Pour Nous is the fifth studio album by Echo Orbiter.  It was released on Looking Glass Workshop in 2003.  A return to a more Indie rock driven sound, the album also features lyrical themes highly influenced by Existential writers such as Albert Camus and Nietzsche and poets ranging from Charles Baudelaire to beat poets such as Jack Kerouac.  The title of the album, Qu’est-ce Pour Nous, is taken from a line in an Arthur Rimbaud poem roughly translating to, "What does it matter?"

Track listing

Credits
Justin Emerle - guitar, vocals, percussion, keyboards
Colin Emerle - bass guitar

References

External links
Qu’est-ce Pour Nous

2003 albums
Echo Orbiter albums